David Micahnik (born November 5, 1938) is an American fencer and fencing coach. He was born in Hazleton, Pennsylvania, and is Jewish.

Biography
Micahnik attended the University of Pennsylvania (1959), fencing for the University of Pennsylvania Quakers, and was a first-team All-Ivy selection in epee as a senior. He was the 1960 U.S. National Champion.

He competed in the individual and team épée events at the 1960, 1964 and 1968 Summer Olympics.

Micahnik won the individual epee title and took second in foil, and won gold medals with the epee and foil teams, at the 1965 Maccabiah Games. He again won the individual and team gold medals in epee at the 1969 Maccabiah Games. He coached the U.S. fencing teams at the 1985 Maccabiah Games and the 1993 Maccabiah Games.

Micahnik is a member of the USFA Hall of Fame.

References

External links
 

1938 births
Living people
American male épée fencers
American male foil fencers
Olympic fencers of the United States
Fencers at the 1960 Summer Olympics
Fencers at the 1964 Summer Olympics
Fencers at the 1968 Summer Olympics
People from Hazleton, Pennsylvania
Sportspeople from Pennsylvania
Jewish male épée fencers
Jewish male foil fencers
Jewish American sportspeople
Maccabiah Games medalists in fencing
Maccabiah Games gold medalists for the United States
Maccabiah Games silver medalists for the United States
Competitors at the 1965 Maccabiah Games
Competitors at the 1969 Maccabiah Games
Penn Quakers fencers
21st-century American Jews